Alas Poor Yagan is an editorial cartoon, drawn by Dean Alston and published in The West Australian newspaper on 6 September 1997.  It consists of a panel of eight drawings of Noongar activist Ken Colbung speaking to a group of three Indigenous Australian children. The cartoon's content offended many Australians, and resulted in a complaint of racism to the Human Rights and Equal Opportunity Commission.  The commission eventually ruled that the cartoon made inappropriate references to Noongar beliefs but did not breach the Racial Discrimination Act 1975.  This ruling was subsequently upheld on appeal to the Federal Court of Australia.

Background

Alas Poor Yagan was published shortly after the return of Yagan's head from the United Kingdom. Yagan was a Noongar warrior who resisted the European settlement of Western Australia. He was shot dead by a settler in 1833, and his head was removed and sent to the United Kingdom for display in a museum. In 1964, it was buried in an unmarked grave in a local cemetery. The Noongar community began efforts to locate and repatriate the head in 1990.  Yagan's head was finally exhumed in September 1997, but organisation of the handover "was accompanied by a degree of sometimes undignified acrimony over who had the appropriate cultural claims, by descent, to bring the remains back". These conflicts within the Noongar community were publicly aired, and at one point even involved litigation in the Supreme Court of Western Australia.

Publication
The West Australian provided coverage of the repatriation of Yagan's head, including the conflict within the Nyungar community. Alas Poor Yagan was published on 6 September 1997.  It was critical of the fact that the return of Yagan's head had become a source of conflict between Noongars instead of fostering unity, and it lampooned the conduct of those involved in the conflict. It could also be interpreted as insulting aspects of Indigenous Australian culture, and casting aspersions on the motives and legitimacy of Indigenous Australians with mixed racial heritage.

Complaint
On 24 September 1997, a complaint about the cartoon was lodged with the Race Discrimination Commissioner of the Human Rights and Equal Opportunity Commission.  The complaint was made by human rights lawyer Hannah McGlade on behalf of a group of people calling themselves "The Nyungar Circle of Elders", and comprising Albert Corunna, Richard Wilkes, Violet Newman, Mingli Wanjurri, Leisha Eatts, Robert Bropho and Ken Colbung.  The complainants alleged that Alston and The West Australian had breached "s18c of the Racial Discrimination Act 1975".

On 4 March 1998, the Race Discrimination Commissioner discontinued her inquiry into the case on the grounds that the cartoon was "an artistic work" that was published "reasonably and in good faith", and was therefore exempt from the s18c conditions under s18d of the Act.  The Nyungar Circle of Elders rejected that finding, and asked for the case to be referred to the commission for public inquiry.  A public hearing was held on 29 April 1999, and the findings released on 12 April 2001.  The Commission found that the cartoon was in breach of s18c of the Act; specifically, it found that the cartoon:
 contained a demeaning portrayal of Yagan;
 reinforced a negative stereotype regarding alcohol and Indigenous Australians;
 contained derogatory references to the Wagyl, a religious figure;
 treated death in a manner offensive to Indigenous Australians;
 provided intimate details of the ancestry of individuals, in some cases "where the intercourse was not a matter of choice for the Aboriginal women concerned";
 implied a diminishing of the race by the resultant racial mix; and
 reinforced a negative stereotype of Indigenous people taking advantage of government grants.
The commission also found, however, that the cartoon was exempt under s18d of the Act, because it was done reasonably and in good faith.  The reasoning was based partly on the overall coverage of the issue by The West Australian, which "provided a balance report... and an opinion which... encouraged unity in, and support of, the Aboriginal community".  In such a context, the decision by then editor Paul Murray to publish the cartoon was found to be reasonable.

Robert Bropho then sought a judicial review of the commission's finding, but his application was dismissed on 4 December 2002.  Bropho then appealed against that decision in the Federal Court of Australia.  On 6 February 2004, the Federal Court dismissed the appeal and ordered Bropho to pay all costs.

Analysis
According to McGlade, a number of academic commentators have expressed concern about the ruling, in particular that the protections offered under section 18c were being undermined by a broad interpretation of the s18d exemption. McGlade has argued that "it is extremely difficult to reconcile the serious finding of breach under section 18C with the subsequent finding of reasonableness under section 18D", and that "obviously the adverse findings made of the Commission could have been relied upon to defeat the respondent's claim to have acted reasonably and in good faith. It appears that the complainants were placed under an impossible burden of proving explicit motive and intent.... [P]roper remedies are being denied by the responsible bodies." A similar point is made by Anna Chapman, who argues that "the result of the case was a reification of dominant racial values... in prioritising non-indigenous racial narratives over Indigenous perspectives."

References

1997 in Australia
Australian art
Australian case law
Editorial cartoons
History of Western Australia
Indigenous Australian politics
Noongar
Anti-indigenous racism in Australia
Cartoon controversies